Lineboro Historic District is a national historic district at Lineboro, Carroll County, Maryland, United States. It comprises most of the village of Lineboro.  In addition to a number of 19th and early 20th century homes, also present are agricultural outbuildings, including bank barns. Public, commercial, and industrial buildings include several stores, a one-room school and a fire hall. Other buildings of interest include the former hotel, a feed mill, and the 1908 cruciform-plan Gothic Revival Lazarus Union Church. The district comprises a total of 83 resources, of which 70, or 84%, contribute to its significance.

It was added to the National Register of Historic Places in 1996.

References

External links
, including photo from 2006, at Maryland Historical Trust
Boundary Map of the Lineboro Historic District, Carroll County, at Maryland Historical Trust

Historic districts in Carroll County, Maryland
Historic districts on the National Register of Historic Places in Maryland
National Register of Historic Places in Carroll County, Maryland